Rumacon is a genus of beetles in the family Cerambycidae, containing the following species:

 Rumacon annulicornis (Melzer, 1930)
 Rumacon canescens (Bruch, 1926)

References

Aerenicini